Amir Mazloum, born 27 January 1996 is an Iranian Footballer who plays for Saipa in the Persian Gulf Pro League. He formerly played for the Iran national under-17 football team and the Iran national under-20 football team.

International career

U17
He represented Iran U17 in 2012 AFC U-16 Championship and 2013 FIFA U-17 World Cup.

U20
He invited to Iran U20 by Ali Dousti Mehr to preparation for 2014 AFC U-19 Championship.

References

1996 births
Living people
Place of birth missing (living people)
Damash Gilan players
Iranian footballers
Iran under-20 international footballers
People from Rasht
Association football forwards
Sportspeople from Gilan province